Ader is a French automobile.

Ader may also refer to:

Ader (surname)
Ader Tower, historical monument in Buenos Aires
Mount Ader, mountain in Antarctica